Maria Bogoslov (born 13 August 1970) is a Romanian table tennis player. She competed in the women's doubles event at the 1992 Summer Olympics.

References

1970 births
Living people
Romanian female table tennis players
Olympic table tennis players of Romania
Table tennis players at the 1992 Summer Olympics
People from Jimbolia